RC-1 or Boulevard Roads is a state highway that forms the boundary ring of the city of Puducherry. Now it exist inside the Puducherry Municipality limits. RC-1  starts and ends at Puducherry Railway Station forming a ring.

It comparises of
 Goubert Avenue (East Boulevard)
 S V Patel Road (North Boulevard)
 Anna Salai (West Boulevard)
 Subbiah Salai (South Boulevard)

Route 

RC-1 starts at Puducherry Railway Station and runs eastwards as Goubert Avenue (East Boulevard) till Kargil Memorial and then turns northward as SV Patel Road (North Boulevard) till Madras Vayil (Ajantha Junction) and then turn West as Anna Salai (West Boulevard) and runs up to Anna Square. From Anna Square it turns south  as Subbiah Salai (South Boulevard) to complete the ring at Puducherry Railway Station

Landmarks

East Boulevard 
 Puducherry Port
 Statue of Joseph François Dupleix
 Promenade
 Old Court Building
 Zeroth Point of Puducherry-Villupuram Road (RC-3)
 French War Memorial
 Puducherry Municipality
 Statue of Mahatma Gandhi
 Old Light House
 Puducherry Chief Secretariat 
 Kargil Memorial

North Boulevard 
 Sri Aurobindo Ashram

West Boulevard 
 Pothys Shopping Mall

South Boulevard 
 Botanical Garden
 Puducherry Railway Station

References

External links
 Official website of Public Works Department, Puducherry UT

State highways in Puducherry
Transport in Puducherry